The Seimsky Constituency (No. 110) is a Russian legislative constituency in Kursk Oblast. In 1993-2007 most of the constituency was included into the old Kursk constituency, but in 2016 Lgov constituency was extended to Kursk and gained the name "Kursk constituency", while southern and eastern parts of Kursk Oblast were placed into new Seimsky constituency.

Members elected

Election results

2016

|-
! colspan=2 style="background-color:#E9E9E9;text-align:left;vertical-align:top;" |Candidate
! style="background-color:#E9E9E9;text-align:left;vertical-align:top;" |Party
! style="background-color:#E9E9E9;text-align:right;" |Votes
! style="background-color:#E9E9E9;text-align:right;" |%
|-
|style="background-color: " |
|align=left|Viktor Karamyshev
|align=left|United Russia
|
|52.03%
|-
|style="background:"| 
|align=left|Aleksandr Rutskoy
|align=left|Patriots of Russia
|
|17.03%
|-
|style="background-color:"|
|align=left|Maksim Budanov
|align=left|Communist Party
|
|7.34%
|-
|style="background-color:"|
|align=left|Anna Raspolova
|align=left|Liberal Democratic Party
|
|6.58%
|-
|style="background-color:"|
|align=left|Anatoly Kurakin
|align=left|A Just Russia
|
|3.62%
|-
|style="background:"| 
|align=left|Anton Udovenko
|align=left|Communists of Russia
|
|2.03%
|-
|style="background-color:"|
|align=left|Yury Budkov
|align=left|Independent
|
|2.02%
|-
|style="background-color:"|
|align=left|Valery Akinshin
|align=left|Rodina
|
|1.32%
|-
|style="background: "| 
|align=left|Tatyana Chernikova
|align=left|The Greens
|
|1.32%
|-
|style="background: "| 
|align=left|Yekaterina Vdovina
|align=left|Civic Platform
|
|1.13%
|-
|style="background: "| 
|align=left|Aleksandr Fedulov
|align=left|Party of Growth
|
|0.88%
|-
|style="background: "| 
|align=left|Aleksey Shestavin
|align=left|Yabloko
|
|0.71%
|-
| colspan="5" style="background-color:#E9E9E9;"|
|- style="font-weight:bold"
| colspan="3" style="text-align:left;" | Total
| 
| 100%
|-
| colspan="5" style="background-color:#E9E9E9;"|
|- style="font-weight:bold"
| colspan="4" |Source:
|
|}

2020

|-
! colspan=2 style="background-color:#E9E9E9;text-align:left;vertical-align:top;" |Candidate
! style="background-color:#E9E9E9;text-align:left;vertical-align:top;" |Party
! style="background-color:#E9E9E9;text-align:right;" |Votes
! style="background-color:#E9E9E9;text-align:right;" |%
|-
|style="background-color: " |
|align=left|Aleksey Zolotarev
|align=left|United Russia
|108,523
|60.08%
|-
|style="background-color: " |
|align=left|Aleksey Bobovnikov
|align=left|Communist Party
|25,650
|14.20%
|-
|style="background-color: " |
|align=left|Anatoly Kurakin
|align=left|A Just Russia
|15,727
|8.71%
|-
|style="background-color: " |
|align=left|Aleksey Tomanov
|align=left|Liberal Democratic Party
|14,508
|8.03%
|-
|style="background-color: " |
|align=left|Artyom Vakarev
|align=left|Communists of Russia
|11,388
|6.30%
|-
| colspan="5" style="background-color:#E9E9E9;"|
|- style="font-weight:bold"
| colspan="3" style="text-align:left;" | Total
| 180,626
| 100%
|-
| colspan="5" style="background-color:#E9E9E9;"|
|- style="font-weight:bold"
| colspan="4" |Source:
|
|}

2021

|-
! colspan=2 style="background-color:#E9E9E9;text-align:left;vertical-align:top;" |Candidate
! style="background-color:#E9E9E9;text-align:left;vertical-align:top;" |Party
! style="background-color:#E9E9E9;text-align:right;" |Votes
! style="background-color:#E9E9E9;text-align:right;" |%
|-
|style="background-color: " |
|align=left|Olga Germanova
|align=left|United Russia
|
|42.83%
|-
|style="background-color:"|
|align=left|Aleksey Bobovnikov
|align=left|Communist Party
|
|19.85%
|-
|style="background-color: " |
|align=left|Anastasia Artemova
|align=left|New People
|
|9.36%
|-
|style="background-color:"|
|align=left|Igor Filippovsky
|align=left|A Just Russia — For Truth
|
|7.65%
|-
|style="background-color:"|
|align=left|Aleksey Tomanov
|align=left|Liberal Democratic Party
|
|7.10%
|-
|style="background-color: "|
|align=left|Yelena Timofeeva
|align=left|Party of Pensioners
|
|6.68%
|-
|style="background-color: "|
|align=left|Vladimir Bizyaev
|align=left|Yabloko
|
|1.62%
|-
|style="background-color: "|
|align=left|Vladimir Shalaginov
|align=left|Party of Growth
|
|0.94%
|-
| colspan="5" style="background-color:#E9E9E9;"|
|- style="font-weight:bold"
| colspan="3" style="text-align:left;" | Total
| 
| 100%
|-
| colspan="5" style="background-color:#E9E9E9;"|
|- style="font-weight:bold"
| colspan="4" |Source:
|
|}

Notes

References

Russian legislative constituencies
Politics of Kursk Oblast